Discoveries  is a 1939 British, black-and-white, musical, directed by Redd Davis and starring Ronald Shiner as Jim Pike. It was produced by the British Grand National Pictures, which is not to be confused with the later, American Grand National Films Inc.

The film is notable for introducing the song "There'll Always Be an England", which is sung onscreen by the boy soprano Glyn Davies, and which after war broke out on 1 September gained an enormous success as sung by Vera Lynn.

Synopsis
A pre-1900s burlesque, vaudeville revue, Carroll Levis brings newly discovered talent to the screen. The film consists of a number of music hall turns.

References

External links
 
 
 

1939 films
1939 musical films
British black-and-white films
Films directed by Redd Davis
British musical films
Films with screenplays by Anatole de Grunwald
1930s English-language films
1930s British films